Aketi Territory is a territory in the Bas-Uele Province of the Democratic Republic of the Congo. The administrative capital is located at Aketi. The territory borders Bondo Territory to the north, Buta Territory to the east, Basoko Territory to the south, Bumba Territory to the west in Mongala Province and Yakoma Territory in Nord-Ubangi Province to the northwest. Rivers include the Likati River, Zoki River, Maze River, Tinda River, Tshimbi River, Elongo River, Aketi River, Yoko River and Lese River along the southern territorial border.

Subdivisions
The territory contains the following chiefdoms/sectors:

 Avuru-Duma
 Avuru-Gatanga
 Bondongola
 Mabinza
 Mobati-Boyele
 Mongwandi
 Gbandi
 Yoko

References

Territories of Bas-Uélé Province